Bundle of Hiss was an American grunge band formed in 1980 in Stanwood, Washington by pre-Tad member Kurt Danielson, guitarist Jeff Hopper, vocalist Kurt Schonberg and drummer Russ Bartlett.

History 
Schonberg left the band after recording demo tapes. They featured various drummers before finding Dan Peters. Hopper later left the band and was replaced by Jamie Lane, who had met Kurt Danielson at the University of Washington.

In 1986, Russ Bartlett left the band to pursue a solo career. Jamie Lane then took up vocals and guitar. The band recorded demo tapes and passed them on to fans at their shows and fellow Seattle bands, such as Soundgarden, Mudhoney, and Melvins. In 1988, the group officially disbanded. Kurt Danielson formed his new band, Tad, with former drummer Tad Doyle. Dan Peters became the drummer in another local band, Feast, which disbanded shortly after he joined. After Feast broke up, Peters formed Mudhoney with Mark Arm and Steve Turner. In 2000, Bundle of Hiss re-released an old demo tape on Loveless Records called Sessions: 1986-1988.

References

External links
 Band website

Rock music groups from Washington (state)
American musical trios
Grunge musical groups
People from Stanwood, Washington
Musical groups established in 1980
Musical groups disestablished in 1988